Marie-Jo Pelletier (born 5 September 1997) is a Canadian former ice hockey player. She played her entire professional career for the Buffalo Beauts of the Premier Hockey Federation (PHF; called NWHL until 2021).

Playing career 
Pelletier played college ice hockey with the New Hampshire Wildcats women's ice hockey program in the Hockey East (WHEA) conference of the NCAA Division I during 2015 to 2019. With the Wildcats, she scored 52 points across 143 games and was a three-season captain. She garnered the nickname 'Mighty Mouse,' a recognition of her excellent play in defiance of her short stature. She won the Hockey East Sportsmanship Award in 2019, becoming the second University of New Hampshire (UNH) player to win the award, after Sara Carlson.

Following graduation in 2019, Pelletier opted to sign with the Buffalo Beauts of the National Women's Hockey League (NWHL). As a rookie in the 2019–20 NWHL season, she posted 21 points in 24 games – setting a league record for most power-play points in a season – and was named to the 2020 NWHL All-Star Game. She was also a finalist for the NWHL Newcomer of the Year award and was selected as one of the NWHL Fans’ Three Stars of the Year.

In the 2020–21 season, she contributed 3 assists across 6 games in the Lake Placid bubble but the Beauts narrowly missed the playoffs. On 13 May 2021, Pelletier became the first player in the league to sign a contract for the 2021–22 season, returning to the Beauts for a third season. 

On April 1st, 2022, Pelletier announced her retirement via social media.

Career Statistics

References

External links
 

1997 births
Living people
People from Restigouche County, New Brunswick
Ice hockey people from New Brunswick
Canadian women's ice hockey defencemen
Buffalo Beauts players
New Hampshire Wildcats women's ice hockey players
Canadian expatriate ice hockey players in the United States